According to the Bible, Bera ( Beraʿ ) (possibly meaning "gift") was the king of the wicked city of Sodom, spoken of in Genesis 14:2, "... that they made war with Bera king of Sodom."

Scholars are divided on Genesis 14. According to Frances Anderson, "Opinions range from identifying Genesis 14 as a piece of late fiction" to scholars who believe there may be "some historical foundation" behind the narrative it relates.

In the narrative, Bera joins four other Canaanite city kings in rebelling against Chedorlaomer, an Elamite king and his allies who rule a vast area. In the Battle of the Vale of Siddim, the combined imperial forces plunder Sodom and nearby cities, taking many people captive and also much plunder. Bera and the king of Gomorrah, Birsha, flee the battle and fall into one of Siddim's many tarpits while other survivors escape into the mountains (14:10).

In popular culture 
In the Israel film Zohi Sdom, roughly based upon the Biblical tale of Sodom and Gomorrah, King Bera is portrayed by actor Eli Finish as the corrupt dictator of the city.

References

External links
 

Sodom and Gomorrah
Torah monarchs
Lech-Lecha
Book of Genesis people
Canaanite people
Ancient rebels